Nellie Breen (April 3, 1897 – April 26, 1986) was an American comedian and dancer. In vaudeville, she appeared in a double act with Lester Allen. Her Broadway theater credits include: Everything (1918), The Passing Show of 1922 (1922), Ginger (1923, as the character Ruth Warewell), Mercenary Mary (1925, as the character Norah), Florida Girl (1925, as the character Betty), and The Desert Song (1926, as the character Susan). In 1922, she did the first tap dance on radio.

Breen was born in Lawrence, Massachusetts, to an Australian mother and Irish-American father who married in Victoria, Australia. She died in Santa Clara County, California, aged 89.

References

1897 births
1986 deaths
People from Lawrence, Massachusetts
American female dancers
American tap dancers
American women comedians
Vaudeville performers
American stage actresses
American people of Irish descent
American people of Australian descent
20th-century American dancers
20th-century American actresses